Abdullah Al Karbi (Arabic:عبد الله الكربي) (born 26 August 1998) is an Emirati footballer. He currently plays as a right back for Al-Wahda.

Career
Al Karbi started his career at Al-Wahda and is a product of the Al-Wahda's youth system. On 19 October 2019, Al Karbi made his professional debut for Al-Wahda against Baniyas in the Pro League .

References

External links
 

1998 births
Living people
Emirati footballers
Al Wahda FC players
UAE Pro League players
Association football fullbacks
Place of birth missing (living people)